Shorea platyclados (called, along with some other species in the genus Shorea, dark red meranti) is a species of plant in the family Dipterocarpaceae. It is found in Sumatra, peninsular Malaysia and Borneo. It is an endangered species threatened by habitat loss.

References

platyclados
Trees of Sumatra
Trees of Peninsular Malaysia
Trees of Borneo
Endangered plants
Taxonomy articles created by Polbot